Gaetana is the debut album by Italian pop singer Giusy Ferreri,
it was released on November 14, 2008, in Italy, and digitally in many other European countries.Four singles were released from the album: "Non ti scordar mai di me", "Novembre", "Stai fermo lì" and "La scala (The Ladder)". Gaetana has sold around 500,000 copies only in Italy being certified 6 times platinum and around 600.000 copies worldwide.

Promotion and release
The album was heavily promoted, and special advertising was arranged in collaboration with MTV Italy before and during the week of release. The entire album was streamed on MTV's website, beginning on November 10, 2008, a week before the album's Italian release date. Gaetana reached at #1 on iTunes Italy on the first day of release and debuted on the Italian FIMI albums chart at number two where it went on to peak for seven weeks, fended off by Laura Pausini's album Primavera in anticipo.

In 2009 Gaetana was released in France, Belgium, Spain, Germany and Greece.

Album information
Italian singer Tiziano Ferro collaborated with Giusy on the song "L'amore e basta" and wrote the songs "Stai fermo lì", "Passione positiva", "Aria di vita" and the hit single  "Non ti scordar mai di me". American singer, songwriter and producer Linda Perry wrote the songs "La scala (The Ladder)", which has already been recorded with her band "4 Non Blondes" in 1994 but remained unreleased  and "Cuore assente (The La La Song)".

The tracks written by Giusy Ferreri are "Pensieri", "In assenza", "Piove" and "Il party".

Track listing
Italian Edition

 "L'amore e basta!" (feat Tiziano Ferro)
 "Novembre"
 "Stai fermo lì"
 "Non ti scordar mai di me"
 "Aria di vita"
 "Passione positiva"
 "La scala (The Ladder)"
 "Pensieri"
 "In assenza"
 "Il sapore di un altro no"
 "Cuore assente (The La La Song)"
 "Piove"
 "Il party"
 "Nunca te olvides de mí (Non ti scordar mai di me - Spanish version)" (Bonus Track)

Spanish Edition

 "El amor y basta" (feat. Tiziano Ferro)
 "Noviembre"
 "Parado ahí"
 "Nunca te olvides de mí"
 "Aire de vida"
 "Pasión positiva"
 "La scala (The Ladder)"
 "Pensamientos"
 "En ausencia de ti"
 "La amargura de otro no"
 "Cuore assente"
 "Llueve"
 "El party"

Collaborations
Linda Perry
Tiziano Ferro
Sergio Cammariere
Roberto Casalino

Release history

Charts and certifications

References

External links
 Giusy Ferreri official website

Giusy Ferreri albums
2008 debut albums
Sony Music Italy albums
European Border Breakers Award-winning albums